M. Velu Kumar (born 16 January 1973) is a Sri Lankan politician, former provincial minister and Member of Parliament.

Early life
Velu Kumar was born on 16 January 1973. He was educated at Thalathuoya Tamil Maha Vidyalayam, Asoka Vidyalayam, Kandy and St. Sylvester's College, Kandy. After school he joined the University of Colombo, graduating with a B.B.A. degree.

Career
Velu Kumar is a member of the Democratic People's Front. He was elected one of the vice-presidents of the Tamil Progressive Alliance in June 2015.

Velu Kumar contested the 2013 provincial council election as one of the United National Front electoral alliance's candidates in Kandy District and was elected to the Central Provincial Council. He contested the 2015 parliamentary election as one of the United National Front for Good Governance electoral alliance's candidates in Kandy District and was elected to the Parliament of Sri Lanka. He was re-elected at the 2020 parliamentary election.

Electoral history

References

1973 births
Alumni of St. Sylvester's College
Alumni of the University of Colombo
Democratic People's Front politicians
Indian Tamil politicians of Sri Lanka
Living people
Members of the 15th Parliament of Sri Lanka
Members of the 16th Parliament of Sri Lanka
Members of the Central Provincial Council
People from Central Province, Sri Lanka
Samagi Jana Balawegaya politicians
Sri Lankan Hindus